= Charmingly Awkward =

Studio album by Street to Nowhere
- Released: November 26, 2005
- Recorded: 2004–2005
- Genres: Indie, alternative
- Label: None

Professional ratings
Review scores
Source	Rating
RebelPunk	3/5 stars

Charmingly Awkward is the first studio album by the rock band Street To Nowhere. It was independently released in 2005, and officially released in 2006 through Capitol Records.

== Track listing ==
1. "Screamin" - 3:12
2. "Boxcars Boxcars Boxcars" – 4:30
3. "Georgia, Can You Hear Me?" – 5:04
4. "Miss Rolling Eyes" - 4:49
5. "Waste My Life For You" - 2:23
6. "Dead Cliché" - 3:17
7. "Tipsy" – 4:49
8. "The Sun" - 3:43
9. "They're Not Like Us" – 3:10
10. "Leave the Cameras On" - 2:42
11. "You Can't Go To Sleep" - 5:59

== Information ==
1. Featured various members of Bay Area bands on the end of "Tipsy".
2. Recorded in 10 different places, including apartments, basements, living rooms, and even a cabin.
3. Dave celebrated three birthdays in the time it took from the first tracks to be laid down until the release.
4. Recorded on a budget gathered from local shows and sales of t-shirts and demos.
5. Dave Smallen created the cover art.
